Stadion Hristo Botev is a multi-purpose stadium in Gabrovo, Bulgaria. This 14,000 seat stadium is currently used for football matches and is the home ground of FC Yantra. 

Some interesting concerts took place at the stadium in 1988 - Uriah Heep, 2002 - t.A.T.u.
The stadium hosted the 1990 Final match of Bulgarian Football Cup between FC Sliven and CSKA Sofia which was won 2-0 by Sliven.
Since 2004, every summer the stadium is a host to a football tournament: "Kamenitza fan cup"

Other Pictures

Sports venues in Bulgaria
Athletics (track and field) venues in Bulgaria
Football venues in Bulgaria
Gabrovo
Multi-purpose stadiums in Bulgaria
Buildings and structures in Gabrovo Province
Sports venues completed in 1919
1919 establishments in Bulgaria